There are several lakes named Mud Lake within the U.S. state of Idaho.

 Mud Lake, Bear Lake County, Idaho. 
 Mud Lake, Blaine County, Idaho.    
 Mud Lake, Boise County, Idaho.     
 Mud Lake, Bonner County, Idaho.    
 Mud Lake, Idaho County, Idaho.     
 Mud Lake, Idaho County, Idaho.     
 Mud Lake, Jefferson County, Idaho 
 Mud Lake, Nez Perce County, Idaho. 
 Mud Lake, Shoshone County, Idaho.  
 Mud Lake, Valley County, Idaho.

Other places
 Mud Lake, Idaho, a city in Jefferson County 
 Mud Lake Wildlife Management Area, in Jefferson County and managed by the Idaho Department of Fish and Game

References
 USGS-U.S. Board on Geographic Names

Lakes of Idaho